Billy Liar is a 1959 novel by Keith Waterhouse that was later adapted into a play, a film, a musical and a TV series. The work has inspired and been featured in a number of popular songs.

The semi-comical story is about William Fisher, a working-class 19-year-old living with his parents in the fictional town of Stradhoughton in Yorkshire. Bored by his job as a lowly clerk for an undertaker, Billy spends his time indulging in fantasies and dreams of life in the big city as a comedy writer.

Characters

William "Billy" Fisher
Billy is 19, and living with parents Alice and Geoffrey, and his grandmother, Florence Boothroyd. Billy lies compulsively to everyone he comes across, whether it is by claiming that his father is a retired naval captain/cobbler, or telling his parents that Arthur's mother has broken her leg. Billy works as a clerk for undertakers Shadrack & Duxbury. He is engaged to two girls and in love with a third, and he constantly refers to a vague job offer writing scripts in London for comedian "Danny Boon".

Alice Fisher
Billy's mother. She rarely sits down in the play, constantly working hard to keep the house tidy and look after her husband, her mother, and Billy.

Geoffrey Fisher
Billy's father. Geoffrey uses the word "bloody" in his sentences so often it has lost all meaning. Geoffrey has been a successful garage owner who also works in the removal business so his family live middle-class lives despite his working-class background. Geoffrey has a short temper, but otherwise rarely shows emotion.  Relations between Geoffrey and Billy have broken down, providing the story's main source of conflict.

Florence Boothroyd
Billy's grandmother, Alice's mother. She is ignored by her family and never seen as a loved character until the end. Florence talks to the sideboard more than her own family, and is always drinking tea out of a pint pot. She keeps pots of condensed milk upstairs. Florence falls ill in Act 2 and is taken upstairs. By Act 3, she has died. She likely has a form of dementia because of her strange behaviour throughout the book. Her age is either 80 or 81 years old, and she was born in August.

Arthur Crabtree
Billy's best friend. Arthur works at Shadrack & Duxbury with Billy. When we first see Arthur and Billy together in Act 1, they adopt thick northern accents and engage in buffoonery, imitating their elders. Despite this tomfoolery, Arthur's mood towards Billy changes in Act 3. Arthur does not appear in Act 2.

Barbara
One of Billy's fiancees. Barbara is prudish, always eating oranges, and harbours dreams of living with Billy in a cottage in Devon, with "little Billy and little Barbara". She finds out about other girlfriends later in the play.

Rita
Rita is 17, is short, but comes across as a "hard lass". She is engaged to Billy, and has a habit of mimicking Billy every time he offers an excuse for her missing engagement ring. Unbeknown to her, it is on Barbara's finger. Rita appears in Acts 2 and 3.

Liz
Liz is described as a scruffy girl in need of a new skirt, but she's the one who truly understands Billy and the only one in which he's genuinely interested. Before her appearance in the play, Billy pretends he does not have much interest in her, but it is clear when she appears that he is still smitten with her.

Adaptations

Stage play
In 1960, the novel's author, Keith Waterhouse, co-wrote a three-act stage version with Willis Hall. The action took place on a single set combining the living-room, hallway, and porch of the Fisher household. The first production opened in the West End of London with Albert Finney in the title role. It has since been produced all over the world, and has become a favourite with amateur groups.  The play was adapted for the Irish stage as Liam Liar by Hugh Leonard in 1976.

The play is set in one Saturday: Act 1 in the morning, Act 2 in the early evening, and Act 3 at night.

Film

The 1963 film was directed by John Schlesinger and featured Tom Courtenay, who played the part when Albert Finney left the cast in the West End play, as Billy and Julie Christie as Liz, one of his three girlfriends. Mona Washbourne played Mrs. Fisher, and Wilfred Pickles played Mr. Fisher. Rodney Bewes, Finlay Currie, and Leonard Rossiter also had roles.

British TV series

The novel was also used as the basis for a sitcom made by London Weekend Television in 1973–1974, starring Jeff Rawle as Billy. The series was scripted by the play's writers, Waterhouse and Hall, and the action was updated to the 1970s. George A. Cooper reprised his West End role as Billy's father. Other regular cast members included Pamela Vezey as Alice, Colin Jeavons as Shadrack, May Warden as Billy's grandmother, and Sally Watts as Barbara. Several new girlfriends were also introduced.

The series was shown on the Seven Network in Australia during the non-ratings season of 1975–1976, shown on CBC Television in Canada in 1975–1976, and shown on RTÉ 2 in Ireland in 1982. It has never been rerun, although the first series was released on Region 2 DVD in August 2006. The second series was released in March 2007. The complete series was released on 07/05/2018.

Stage musical

In 1974, a successful West End musical (entitled simply Billy) starred Michael Crawford and, in her West End debut, Elaine Paige. The cast also included Gay Soper, Avis Bunnage, Bryan Pringle and Lockwood West. The book was by well-known British sitcom writers Dick Clement and Ian La Frenais, and the music and lyrics were by film composer John Barry and Don Black respectively.

American TV series
An American adaptation entitled Billy and starring Steve Guttenberg, Peggy Pope, and James Gallery aired briefly on CBS in 1979.

In popular culture

Waterhouse later wrote a sequel called Billy Liar on the Moon.
There is also an acoustic folk/punk singer from Scotland called Billy Liar.
"Billy Liar" is the title of the second track of Her Majesty the Decemberists by The Decemberists.
Saint Etienne sampled some lines from the movie in their song "You're in a Bad Way".
The music video for the song "The Importance of Being Idle"  by Oasis contains scenes based on scenes from Billy Liar, although most of it is based on the video for the Kinks' Dead End Street.
The title of the song "Twisterella" is also the title of a song that Billy co-writes in the novel.
 The Kids in the Hall "Billy Dreamer" character is based loosely on Billy Liar.  
The song "William, It Was Really Nothing" by The Smiths took inspiration from the book.
It has been suggested that a local newspaper columnist parodied in both the book and the film bears a remarkable resemblance to the late-life Keith Waterhouse himself, when he was ensconced at the Daily Mail.

References

External links
 Billy! the Musical (Broadway.com article)

1959 British novels
British novels adapted into films
Social realism
Novels set in fictional countries
Novels set in Yorkshire
Michael Joseph books
Novels by Keith Waterhouse